McCarthy Appiah (born 4 August 1996) is a Ghanaian football midfielder who plays for Ashanti Gold.

References

1996 births
Living people
Ghanaian footballers
Ghana international footballers
Ashanti Gold SC players
Association football midfielders